

The BMW VII was a water-cooled twelve-cylinder engine derived from the successful BMW VI. The engine was not as popular as the VI, due in no small part to the Great Depression, and only a small number were built. Experiments with supercharging led to the related BMW IX.

Design and development
The main change from the VI to the VII was the addition of a 0.62 ratio propeller reduction gearing system, allowing the engine to run at higher RPM, and thus higher power settings, while still efficiently driving the same propellers. A more minor change was the movement of the magnetos from the back of the cylinder banks to the front, which allowed easier access for maintenance, (similar changes to the original six-cylinder BMW V led to the BMW VIII) . The crankcase was offered in aluminum alloy or Elektron.

Operational history
The engine was first built in 1928 and passed its acceptance tests in June 1930. Only a few examples of the BMW VII went into operation, in the single-engined version of the Junkers Ju 52, for example, and in the Dornier Wal which Wolfgang von Gronau flew around the world in 1932. The VII was also used for forced-aspiration experiments with a "mixture blower" (a radial fan located behind the carburettor); this led in due course to the development of the BMW IX aircraft engine.

Variants
Low compression A low compression variant ran at 5.5:1 compression ratio, delivering  at 1,565 rpm
Medium compression A medium compression variant ran at 6:1 compression ratio, delivering  at 1,650 rpm
BMW VIIaUA high compression variant running at 7.3:1 compression ratio, delivering  for take-off.

Specifications (variant)

References

BMW aircraft engines
1920s aircraft piston engines